
The Second Battle of Charasiab was fought on 25 April 1880 between the British Empire and Afghan tribesmen, during the Second Anglo-Afghan War.

In April 1880 a 1,200 strong force under Colonel Jenkins, including a half-battalion of the 92nd Highlanders, was sent from Kabul to Charasiab, to protect a supply column sent there to meet Lieutenant-General Stewart's division travelling from Kandahar to Kabul.

On the evening of the 24 April, Jenkins saw that his Charasiab position was about to be attacked by a large force of Logar tribesmen. In response, an additional force under Brigadier-General Macpherson was sent from Kabul, consisting of six guns, a troop of the 3rd Punjab Cavalry and 962 Infantry, while Brigadier-General Hugh Gough, with four guns and a cavalry brigade, took up a position half-way between Kabul and Charasiab.

On the morning of the 25 April, Colonel Jenkins' force was surrounded by attacking tribesmen – around 4,000 by British estimates – kept at bay by steady fire. At 1:00 p.m. Macpherson’s force arrived and immediately attacked the Afghans who were routed, and then pursued by the cavalry and horse artillery for four miles. The battle was over by 4:00 p.m.

Order of battle
Units present included:

9th Lancers (1 squadron)
92nd Highlanders (half-battalion)
3rd Punjab Cavalry (one troop)
2nd Gurkhas (1 company)

See also
 Battle of Charasiab, 6 October 1879

References

Conflicts in 1880
1880 in Afghanistan
Battles of the Second Anglo-Afghan War
Battles involving the United Kingdom
Battles involving Afghanistan
History of Kabul Province
April 1880 events